NFL on Prime Video is the branding used for broadcasts of National Football League (NFL) games on the subscription video on-demand over-the-top streaming and rental service Amazon Prime Video as part of Prime Video Sports. Amazon currently holds exclusive streaming rights for Thursday Night Football.

Along with Prime Video, the games are also simulcast for free on Prime Video's Twitch channel, along with local over-the-air networks in the markets of the teams that are playing.

Overview

Thursday Night Football

On April 4, 2017, it was announced that Amazon had acquired non-exclusive streaming rights to the 10 broadcast television games for the 2017 season over their Amazon Prime Video service, under a deal valued at $50 million, a five-fold increase over the $10 million paid by Twitter. The streams were exclusive to paid Prime subscribers. Amazon planned several special features for its inaugural game, including broadcasting alternate feeds with Spanish, Portuguese, and a secondary English broadcast featuring soccer commentators Ross Dyer and Tommy Smyth (intended for international viewers unfamiliar with the rules and terminology of American football), and a pre-show hosted by Tiki Barber and Curtis Stone.

Amazon renewed its digital rights for the 2018 and 2019 seasons; in contrast to 2017 in which the games required a Prime subscription, for 2018 and 2019, Amazon also carried game coverage for free on its live streaming platform Twitch. Alongside the main Fox feed, British English, and Spanish options, the Amazon Prime streams offered an alternate commentary feed featuring ESPN anchor Hannah Storm and NFL Network chief correspondent Andrea Kremer — the first all-female commentary team in NFL history. The Twitch streams offer access to the service's standard chat room (along with special football-themed emotes), an interactive extension, and co-streams featuring prominent personalities, while streams on Amazon Fire devices offer integration with the X-Ray feature to access statistics and other content.

On April 29, 2020, Amazon renewed its digital rights through the 2022 season, maintaining the 11 TNF simulcasts and digital content. For its simulcasts, Amazon replaced the British feed with a new "Scout's Feed" with extended analysis by Bucky Brooks and Daniel Jeremiah, and NFL Next Live on Twitch (with viewer interactivity). For the 2020 season, Prime Video offered multiple announcer options; NFL Next on Prime Video, live and on-demand on Tuesday nights, hosted by Chris Long, Kay Adams, Andrew Hawkins, and James Koh; X-Ray, offering real-time access to live statistics and insights; and new shows on Twitch, including The NFL Comments Box and The NFL Machine.

In March 2021, Amazon acquired rights to become the exclusive broadcaster of Thursday Night Football initially starting with the 2023 season and running through 2033, paying approximately $1 billion per year to become the first streaming service to exclusively carry a package of NFL games. Regular season games on Thursday nights will increase from 12 to 15 per year, and the package will also include one preseason game per year. Amazon will now be producing its own football game broadcasts, after previously picking up feeds from other networks. The deal also includes pre-game, halftime, and post-game shows, plus in-game highlights and original NFL programming. Because Prime Video is a subscription streaming service, the NFL will require Amazon to have its games syndicated on over-the-air television stations in the local markets of the competing teams. A couple months later, it was announced that Prime Video would take over TNF a year earlier than originally announced in 2022, making the deal 11 years.

Playoff programming
In October 2020, Amazon acquired the rights to stream its first NFL playoff game on Prime Video as part of its digital rights to the league: a simulcast of one of CBS's NFC Wild Card games. This game eventually was the one on January 10, 2021, between the Chicago Bears and the New Orleans Saints. The game was also available on Nickelodeon.

On January 16, 2022, Amazon streamed its second NFL playoff game between the San Francisco 49ers and Dallas Cowboys. It was also a simulcast of a CBS/Nickelodeon broadcast.

Amazon did not stream a playoff game in 2023.

Black​ Friday​ Game​ (2023)
For the 2023 season, Prime Video​ will broadcast the​ first​​ ever​ Black Friday NFL game and will be available for free on both Prime Video and Twitch.

Exclusive Saturday game (2020)
On April 29, 2020, as part of Amazon's renewal of its digital rights through the 2022 season, Amazon acquired the exclusive international rights to one late-season game (which would be produced by CBS).

On December 26, 2020, the Amazon Prime broadcast its first game to be only nationally available on a streaming platform, between the San Francisco 49ers and Arizona Cardinals, which aired on Prime Video, Twitch, Verizon, the NFL app, and the two teams' local stations. It averaged 4.8 million viewers.

The Amazon exclusive game did not return for the 2021 season.

Other programming
The 2020 NFL Holiday Blitz on Prime Video featured a week-long slate of original content with celebrities and athletes including Action Bronson, Quavo, Cari Champion, Victor Cruz and Chad Johnson.

Results

Game announcers

Current announcers
 Al Michaels – play-by-play (2022–present)
 Kirk Herbstreit – color commentator (2022–present)
 Kaylee Hartung – sideline reporter (2022–present)
 Terry McAulay – rules analyst (2022–present)
 Charissa Thompson – pregame host (2022–present)
 Tony Gonzalez – pregame analyst (2022–present)
 Ryan Fitzpatrick – pregame analyst (2022–present)
 Richard Sherman – pregame analyst (2022–present)
 Andrew Whitworth – pregame analyst (2022–present)
 Marshawn Lynch - contributor (2022–present)
 Taylor Rooks – contributor (2022–present)
 Michael Smith – contributor (2022–present)
 Dude Perfect – alternate broadcast announcers (2022–present, select games)
 Hannah Storm – alternate broadcast announcer (2022–present; select games); play-by-play (2018–2021)
 Andrea Kremer – alternate broadcast announcer (2022–present; select games); game analyst (2018–2021)
 LeBron James – alternate broadcast announcers (2022–present; select games)
 Maverick Carter – alternate broadcast announcer (2022–present; select games
 Paul Rivera – alternate broadcast announcer (2022–present; select games)

Former announcers
 Kay Adams – fill-in play-by-play (2021)
 Bucky Brooks – Scout's Feed on Prime Video (2020–2021)
 Sherree Burress – Saturday sideline reporter (2020)
 Andrew Catalon – Saturday play-by-play (2020)
 Terrell Davis – Prime Video studio postgame analyst (2020)
 Daniel Jeremiah – Scout's Feed on Prime Video (2020–2021)
 Maurice Jones-Drew – Prime Video studio pregame/halftime analyst (2020)
 Rhett Lewis – Prime Video studio host (2021)
 James Lofton – Saturday game analyst (2020)
 Beth Mowins – fill-in play-by-play (2018)
 Joy Taylor – Scout's Feed on Prime Video (2020–2021)
 Derek Rae – UK English Feed play-by-play on Prime Video (2017-2019)
 Tommy Smyth – UK English Feed game analyst on Prime Video (2017-2019)
 Ross Dyer – UK English Feed fill-in play-by-play on Prime Video (2017)

See also
List of Amazon Prime Video original programming
History of the National Football League on television

References

External links

Amazon Prime Video original programming
2017 American television series debuts
2010s American television series
2020s American television series
National Football League television series